The Douglas Trojans were a minor league baseball team, based in Douglas, Georgia that played from 1948 until 1956. The team played in the Class D Georgia State League and won three of the league's titles during their brief existence.

The team was first formed in 1948 as the Douglas Rebels, however the team name changed to the Trojans the following year. In 1954, the team became an affiliate of the Cincinnati Redlegs. During their final year in existence the team was renamed the Douglas Reds.

Notable alumni

 Joe Azcue (1956) MLB All-Star

 Johnny Humphries (1948)

Johnny Vander Meer (1956) 4 x MLB All-Star

References
Johnson, Lloyd, and Wolff, Miles, editors: The Encyclopedia of Minor League Baseball. Durham, North Carolina: Baseball America, 1997.
Baseball Reference -Douglas, Georgia

Coffee County, Georgia
Baseball teams established in 1948
Baseball teams disestablished in 1956
1948 establishments in Georgia (U.S. state)
1956 disestablishments in Georgia (U.S. state)
Defunct Georgia State League teams
Professional baseball teams in Georgia (U.S. state)
Cincinnati Reds minor league affiliates
Defunct baseball teams in Georgia